Van papuri (Papouri)(Փափուռի) is a folk dance from the village of Khorkom (Dilkaya), Edremit, Van. It is a form of circle dance. One type of Yalli.

See also

Ankara'dan Abim Geldi
Kalamatianos
Tsamiko
Sirtaki
Omal
Horon
Khigga
An Dro
Tamzara
Hora
Dabke

References 

Armenian music
Turkish music
Circle dances
Year of song unknown
Songwriter unknown